Expert RA is Russia’s oldest credit rating agency and also the largest one in terms of both customers and headcount. Expert RA has been assigning credit ratings for 20 years. Expert RA is on the list of authorized rating institutions, meaning that its credit ratings are applicable for regulatory purposes to banks, insurers, pension funds, and debt issuers.

History 
 1998 - Expert RA creates its Analytics & Communications Business line
 2010 - Expert RA accredited by Russia’s Ministry of Finance
 2014 - Expert RA set up International Group RAEX holding in order to develop its business abroad.
 2016 - Central Bank of Russia  has included Expert RA in the list of accredited credit agencies
 2017 - Change of the rating scale, 19 gradations introduce in the rating system
 2018 - Expert RA signs a strategic partnership memorandum with China Chengxin Credit Rating Group (CCXI).
 2019 - Establishing Expert Business-Solutions, a company intended to support non-rating analytical products.
 2020 - International Capital Markets Association (ICMA) has included Expert RA in the list of independent verifiers of green and social bonds.
 2021 Expert RA assigned ESG ratings (sustainability ratings) to the first six Russian companies.
 2022 Marina Chekurova headed this agency as CEO and Chairman of the Board. Expert RA launched the Expert Pages project, a service for corporations with an extensive database of Russian business companies.

Main activities

Credit Ratings 

Expert RA has more than 700 credit ratings outstanding, including 449 issuer and 334 issue credit ratings (as of January 1, 2022). 

The agency assigns credit ratings to regions and municipalities.

Communications & Analytics 

Expert RA addresses key national issues in cooperation with government agencies, public associations, and regional authorities.

Surveys 

Expert RA publishes over 50 research papers and analytical reports on insurance, banking, asset management, leasing, factoring, auditing, consulting and other industries annually as well rankings.

Business Events 

Every year, Expert RA holds events such as forums, conferences, and round tables.

Rating Scale 
Expert RA National Rating Scale for the Russian Federation Effective from 10 April 2017

Rating methodologies 
Expert RA has 18 active credit rating methodologies, of which 12 are recognized by the regulator  as fully complying with Law 222-FZ and suitable for regulatory purposes.

Recognized for regulatory purposes

 Bank Credit Rating Methodology 
 Credit Rating Methodology for Debt Instruments 
 Credit Rating Methodology for Local & Regional Governments
 Credit Rating Methodology for Non-Financial Companies 
 Insurer Financial Strength Rating Methodology 
 Holding Companies Credit Rating Methodology
 Credit Rating Methodology for Project Finance Companies
 Credit Rating Methodology for Leasing Companies
 Credit Rating Methodology for Microfinance Companies
 Life Insurer Financial Strength Rating Methodology 
 Credit Rating Methodology for Financial Companies
Financial Strength Rating Methodology for Regional Guarantee Organizations

See also
 ACRA (rating agency)

References

Credit rating agencies in Russia
Companies based in Moscow